Ferruccio Bianchi is a former Italian racing driver, whose career consisted of three Mille Miglia entries.

Results

References

 Racing Sports Cars
 World Sports Racing Prototypes - Pre-war Races 1932
 World Sports Racing Prototypes - Pre-war Races 1933
 World Sports Racing Prototypes - Pre-war Races 1934
 Mille Miglia Arrival Orders

Year of birth missing
Year of death missing
Italian racing drivers
Mille Miglia drivers